Scea is a genus of moths of the family Notodontidae.

Species
This genus consists of the following species:

Scea angustimargo Warren, 1905
Scea auriflamma (Geyer, [1827])
Scea bellona (Druce, 1906)
Scea bryki Hering, 1943
Scea circumscripta (Hering, 1925)
Scea cleonica Druce, 1885
Scea curvilimes Prout, 1918
Scea dimidiata (Walker, 1854)
Scea discinota (Warren, 1900)
Scea erasa Prout, 1918
Scea gigantea (Druce, 1896)
Scea grandis (Druce, 1900)
Scea necyria (C. Felder, R. Felder & Rogenhofer, 1875)
Scea semifulva Warren, 1904
Scea servula Warren, 1901
Scea steinbachi Prout, 1918
Scea subcyanea Prout, 1918
Scea superba (Druce, 1890)
Scea torrida Miller, 2008

References

Notodontidae of South America